Washita may refer to

 Washita River
 Washita County, Oklahoma
 Washita, Arkansas, Montgomery County, Arkansas
 Washita, Oklahoma, Caddo County, Oklahoma
 Washita Battlefield National Historic Site
 Washita National Wildlife Refuge, Custer County, Oklahoma
 Battle of Washita River
 Fort Washita, Bryan County, Oklahoma
 Little Washita River, Grady County, Oklahoma
 Washita tribe of Native Americans from northeastern Louisiana along the Ouachita River.

See also
Ouachita (disambiguation)
Wichita (disambiguation)